Stade De La Blancherie is a stadium in Delémont, Switzerland. It is the home of SR Delémont and has a capacity of 5,263. The stadium has 600 seats and 4,600 standing places.

References 
soccerway.com 

Football venues in Switzerland
Buildings and structures in the canton of Jura
Delémont

It was open on the :